Archibald Renwick Macaulay (30 July 1915 – 10 June 1993) was a Scottish football player and manager.

Playing career
Born in Falkirk, Macaulay started his playing career in junior football and joined Rangers in 1933, where he became a regular at the age of only 18. Playing as an inside right, he won a Scottish Cup medal in 1935–36 and a Scottish League Championship medal the year after. In 1937 he was transferred to West Ham United for £6,000; the Second World War interrupted his career somewhat but he still won a Wartime Cup medal in 1940 and played five unofficial wartime matches for Scotland.

Macaulay was signed by Brentford in October 1946, and made his official Scotland debut against England at Wembley Stadium on 12 April 1947. By this time he had been converted to a wing half, Brentford were relegated to the Second Division at the end of the 1946–47 season. Macaulay was selected to play for Great Britain in a one-off match in May 1947.

He was signed by Arsenal in July 1947 for £10,000. Macaulay made his Arsenal debut against Sunderland on 23 August 1947 and in his first season with the Gunners, he played 40 league matches and won a First Division Championship medal. He continued to play for Arsenal as a near ever-present figure for the next two seasons, although he missed out on Arsenal's 1950 FA Cup triumph after manager Tom Whittaker preferred fellow Scot Alex Forbes in the final. Macaulay left Arsenal for Fulham in June 1950; in all he made 108 appearances in three seasons, scoring one goal. He also won six more caps for Scotland while at Arsenal, bringing his total tally to seven. He spent three seasons at Fulham, though he could not save them from relegation to Division Two in 1951–52. He moved to Guildford City after that, to become the club's player-manager.

Managerial career
In 1957 he succeeded Tom Parker as manager of Norwich City, where he led the Third Division side to the FA Cup semi-finals in 1959 in one of the most famous FA Cup runs of all time, and  promotion to the Second Division the following year. In 1961 he moved on to West Bromwich Albion, though the Baggies did little under his two-year reign, instead enjoying mid-table obscurity.

Macaulay finished his managerial career at Brighton & Hove Albion between 1963 and 1968, leading the club to promotion from the Fourth Division in 1965. After that, he left football management completely, and later worked as a traffic warden. He died in June 1993, aged 77.

Honours

Player
Rangers

Scottish League First Division: 1936–37
Scottish Cup: 1935–36

Arsenal

Football League First Division: 1947–48
FA Charity Shield: 1948

Managerial
Brighton Hove & Albion
Football League Fourth Division: 1963–64

References

Sources

External links

1915 births
1993 deaths
Scottish military personnel
Footballers from Falkirk
Scottish footballers
Royal Army Physical Training Corps soldiers
British Army personnel of World War II
Scotland international footballers
Scotland wartime international footballers
Rangers F.C. players
West Ham United F.C. players
Brentford F.C. players
Arsenal F.C. players
Fulham F.C. players
Scottish football managers
Norwich City F.C. managers
West Bromwich Albion F.C. managers
Brighton & Hove Albion F.C. managers
Association football wing halves
Association football inside forwards
Camelon Juniors F.C. players
Scottish Junior Football Association players
English Football League players